Bryson Joseph Louis (27 March 1925 – 23 January 2022) was a Dominican politician from the Dominica Labour Party. He was MP for Salisbury from 1975 to 1980.

Early life 
Louis was born in 1925 in Salisbury in Saint Joseph Parish.

Political career 
Louis was elected to the House of Assembly of Dominica in the 1975 general election.

Death 
A national day of mourning was declared by the Government of Dominica held in his memory. His funeral was held at the Church of St. Theresa in Salisbury on 11 February 2022.

References 

1925 births
2022 deaths
Dominica Labour Party politicians
Members of the House of Assembly of Dominica

Dominican farmers
People from Saint Joseph Parish, Dominica